Causin' Drama is the only album by Alabama based rapper Drama. It was released on February 8, 2000 through Atlantic Records. It contains his best known single, "Left, Right, Left."

It reached #37 on the Billboard 200 album chart for the chart week of April 1, 2000. It also peaked at #6 on the U.S. R&B album chart. It was later certified gold by the R.I.A.A.

Track listing
All songs were written by Terence Cook (Drama).
 "Intro M.I.A." - 0:53
 "Left, Right, Left" - 3:37
 "It's Drastic" - 3:24
 "Double Time (Drama's Cadence)" - 3:33
 "The Plot" - 3:39
 "My Name Is Drama" - 3:10
 "Let's Go to War" - 4:10
 "Mama, Mama" - 4:48
 "I'm Ballin' Man" - 4:30
 "Sir. Yes Sir." - 0:29
 "Left, Right, Left" (Radio Edit) - 3:36

Charts

Weekly charts

Year-end charts

References

2000 debut albums
Albums produced by Shawty Redd